Paola Suárez was the defending champion, but chose not to compete in 2004.

Anna Smashnova-Pistolesi won the title.

Seeds

Draw

Finals

Top half

Bottom half

References 

2004 Singles
Wien Energie Grand Prix
Gast